"The Call" is a song written by Gene MacLellan.  MacLellan originally released a version the song in 1970 that reached #15 on the Canadian Country chart and #91 on the Canadian Top Singles chart.

Anne Murray recording
Anne Murray recorded her first  version on her 1970 album, Honey, Wheat and Laughter.  In 1975, she recorded a different version of the song, produced by Tom Catalano.  The song reached #5 on the Canadian country chart, #6 on the U.S. Adult Contemporary chart, and #13 on the Canadian Adult Contemporary chart in 1976. The song appeared on her 1975 album, Together.

Chart performance

Gene MacLellan

Anne Murray

References

1970 singles
1976 singles
Songs written by Gene MacLellan
1970 songs
Anne Murray songs
Gene MacLellan songs
Capitol Records singles
Song recordings produced by Tom Catalano